Grapefruit is an independent record label and distributor. It began in 2011 as a subscription record club, launching the first series with an album by American band Lambchop, which was a collection of juvenilia by Kurt Wagner, titled Turd Goes Back: Essential Tracks from Secret Sourpuss & Hot Tussy.

History
The label switched from being a subscription-only record club to releasing albums individually. Grapefruit distributes other independent labels as well as its own artists.

Artists
Kurt Wagner, Dead C, Jackson C. Frank, Simon Joyner, Marisa Anderson, Bill Direen, Dump.

See also 
 List of record labels

References

External links
 Official site

Indie rock record labels
Alternative rock record labels
American independent record labels
Record labels established in 2011